Visitation is the second studio album by the Los Angeles-based alternative rock band Division Day, released on 18 August 2009 through Dangerbird Records.  After splitting from their original label — Eenie Meenie Records — the band decided to self-fund these recordings (signing to Dangerbird after all was said and done), and brought in Justin Meldal-Johnsen (Nine Inch Nails, Beck, M83) to produce the album.  Todd Burke (Ben Harper, The Kooks) was also brought to handle the engineering duties.  With most of the tracks nearly-completed by the time they made it into the studio, JMJ and the band were able to record the album relatively quickly; after just ten days at The Bank in Burbank, the album was finished.

Track listing

References

2009 albums
Dangerbird Records albums